Kara is an old township situated near Sirathu, on the banks of river Ganges,  west of the city of Prayagraj in Kaushambi district in Uttar Pradesh state in India. It was capital of a very big region for centuries under the Delhi Sultanate and Jaunpur Sultanate rule.

Name
It has been sometimes spelt at Karrah, Kada and Kurrah but actually it is Kara (in Hindi कड़ा and Urdu کڑہ ) and often called with its sister town across the river Ganges, Manikpur. To this day, it is called Kara-Manikpur. Kara falls in Kaushambi district while Manikpur has now become a part of Pratapgarh district.

Overview 

Centuries ago it was the seat of the Governor of the Sirkar of Kara ("the Province of Kara"). Between the 7th century and the 16th century it retained its charm and importance as the capital, but in 1583, the Mughal emperor Akbar made Allahabad the capital and thus reduced Kara to a subdivision of the province. During British Rule, Allahabad gained so much importance that Kara went into oblivion and today it is a town of dilapidated havelis, forts, and monuments unknown. Hundreds of thousands of graves are in an area with a diameter of 7–8 km (5 miles). This stunning fact emboldens its claim that it had been certainly inhabited by many people during its history.

In the 11th century the warrior saint of Islam, Ghazi Saiyyad Salar Masud defeated the princes of Manikpur and Kara, but Muslim rule was not established till the defeat of Jayachandra by Muhammad Ghori. Manikpur and Kara on the opposite bank of the Ganges were important seats of government in the early Sultanate period. Ala-ud-din Khalji was governor here, before he gained the throne of Delhi by murdering his uncle on the sands of the river between these two places. In the 15th century the district came under the rule of the Sharqi kings of Jaunpur, and after its restoration to Delhi the Rajput chiefs and the Muslim governors were frequently in revolt. The Afghans long retained their hold on the District, and early in the reign of Akbar, the governor of Manikpur rebelled.

Kara lost its importance when Allahabad became the capital of a Province, and from that time it was merely the chief town of a sarkar. The Rajputs again rose during the anarchy which marked the disruption of the empire after the death of Aurangzeb. They were, however, gradually reduced by the Nawabs of Oudh, and in 1759 Kara was removed from the Sufrah of Allahabad. Many noble Muslim families had settled there. With the passage of time they left the town due to the lack of civic amenities and the disinterest of the government for the upkeep and development of the town.

Shah Karak Abdal, a famous sufi saint lies buried here whose annual Urs is the largest Urs in the area of Allahabad.

Kara has been a place of pilgrimage since at least A.D. 1000. It is the site of the holy temple of Kara Devi (Shitala Devi). Once the provincial capital of the Delhi Sultanate, its ruins extend . Kara was also an important township in the medieval kingdoms of northern India and even today one can see the remains of the fort of Jaichand of Kannauj, the last Hindu king of Kannauj.

Places of historical interest include; the Dargah of Khwaja Karak, the Kara Devi Temple, the Samadhi of Saint Maluk Das, a mound called fort of Jai Chand, Jama Masjid, Kshetrapal Bharav Temple, Kaleshwar Mahadev Temple, and Shivala Maharishi Ashram.

See also
 Kara-Manikpur

References

Cities and towns in Kaushambi district